Herbert 'Bert' Sharp (born 1926) is a former Australian international lawn bowler.

He won a gold medal in the fours at the 1982 Commonwealth Games in Brisbane with Keith Poole, Rob Dobbins and Don Sherman .

References

1926 births
Possibly living people
Australian male bowls players
Commonwealth Games medallists in lawn bowls
Commonwealth Games gold medallists for Australia
Bowls players at the 1982 Commonwealth Games
20th-century Australian people
Medallists at the 1982 Commonwealth Games